George Montagu, 4th Duke of Manchester  PC (6 April 17372 September 1788) was a British politician and diplomat.

Early life
He was the son of Robert Montagu, 3rd Duke of Manchester and the former Harriet Dunch. Among his siblings were Lord Charles Montagu (who married Elizabeth Bulmer) and Lady Caroline Montagu (wife of Charles Herbert, grandson of Thomas Herbert, 8th Earl of Pembroke).

His paternal grandparents were Charles Montagu, 1st Duke of Manchester and the former Hon. Dodington Greville. Among his Montagu relatives were uncle William Montagu, 2nd Duke of Manchester (who married Lady Isabella Montagu eldest daughter of John Montagu, 2nd Duke of Montagu and Lady Mary Churchill) and aunt Lady Charlotte Montagu (who married Pattee Byng, 2nd Viscount Torrington). His mother, a daughter and co-heiress of Edmund Dunch and Elizabeth Godfrey (the noted beauty), was a sister-in-law of Hugh Boscawen, 1st Viscount Falmouth and niece of John Churchill, 1st Duke of Marlborough.

Career
Like his father before him, Manchester was a Whig Member of Parliament for Huntingdonshire from 1761 to 1762, when he inherited his father's title. Upon acceding to the dukedom, he employed Robert Adam to make designs for Kimbolton Castle, his principal seat.

He served as Collector of Subsidies in the Port of London in 1762 and was Lord of the Bedchamber from 1762 to 1770, resigning his position after the fall of the Grafton ministry in January and went into opposition. Beginning in 1782, he succeeded the Earl of Hertford as Lord Chamberlain of the Household, serving until 1783 Lord Hertford resumed his duties.

He was a supporter of Lord Rockingham, and an active opponent in the House of Lords of Lord North's American policy.  In the Rockingham ministry of 1782 Manchester became Lord Chamberlain, Also in 1782, he was appointed a Privy Councillor. In 1783, he was appointed Ambassador to France to "supervise the conclusion of treaty negotiations between Great Britain and France, Spain, and the Netherlands." Manchester signed the Peace of Paris at Versailles for Great Britain to end the American Revolutionary War.

Manchester was Lord Lieutenant of Huntingdonshire from 1762 until his death in 1788. He was also Grand Master of the Freemasons from 1777 to 1782 when he was succeeded by Prince Henry, Duke of Cumberland and Strathearn.

Personal life
On 22 October 1762, Manchester was married to Elizabeth Dashwood (–1832). She was a daughter of Sir James Dashwood, 2nd Baronet of Kirtlington Park and the former Elizabeth Spencer (a daughter and co-heiress of Edward Spencer of Rendlesham). They had several children, including:

 George Montagu, Viscount Mandeville (1763–1772), who died in childhood.
 Lady Caroline Maria Montagu (1770–1847), married James Graham, 3rd Duke of Montrose.
 William Montagu, 5th Duke of Manchester (1771–1843), who married Lady Susan Gordon, the third daughter of Alexander Gordon, 4th Duke of Gordon. Lady Susan was the co-heiress of her brother, George Gordon, 5th Duke of Gordon.
 Lord Frederick Montagu (1774–1827), who died unmarried.
 Lady Anna Maria Montagu (d. 1796), who died unmarried.
 Lady Emily Montagu, (d. 1838), who served as Housekeeper of Hampton Court Palace.

Manchester was notoriously short of funds, and in 1767 it was necessary for him to sell the Manchester family London house in Berkeley Square to the banker and politician Robert Child.

The Duke of Manchester died, after a brief illness, on 2 September 1788.  The Dowager Duchess of Manchester died on 26 June 1832.

References

External links

George Montagu, 4th Duke of Manchester (1737-1788), Politician and diplomat at the National Portrait Gallery, London

1737 births
1788 deaths
Diplomatic peers
George 1
Lord-Lieutenants of Huntingdonshire
Mandeville, George Montagu, Viscount
Members of the Privy Council of Great Britain
George Montagu, 04th Duke of Manchester
Ambassadors of Great Britain to France
British MPs 1761–1768
Grand Masters of the Premier Grand Lodge of England
Freemasons of the Premier Grand Lodge of England